Charley McMillan-López (born 27 March 1997) is a professional British Virgin Islands international footballer who plays as a forward, and currently plays for College 1975 in the Gibraltar Football League.

International career
McMillan-López was named in the squad in May 2021, with the official British Virgin Islands Football Association website article showing him as the only squad player then unattached to a club. He made his senior international debut on 2 June 2021 in a 2022 FIFA World Cup qualification match against Cuba.  Three days later he earned his second cap in the tournament, coming on as a second-half substitute against Curaçao.

Career statistics

References

Living people
1997 births
British Virgin Islands footballers
British Virgin Islands international footballers
Association football forwards
East Thurrock United F.C. players
Ashford United F.C. players
Expatriate footballers in England